Sundsvalls Tidning is a local morning newspaper published in Sundsvall, Sweden, which has been in circulation since 1841.

History and profile
Sundsvalls Tidning was first published in January 1841 with eight pages. The paper is based in Sundsvall and is a local morning publication. The owner of the paper was a family company with the same name until 1985 when it was acquired by the Gefle Dagblad company which has a liberal stance. In 1994 the Gefle Dagblad company became the sole owner of the paper.

The company evolved later as MittMedia and owns seventeen newspapers, including Sundsvalls Tidning which has a liberal leaning.

In 2003 Sundsvalls Tidning acquired its local competitor Dagbladet Nya Samhället.

Sundsvalls Tidning was printed in broadsheet format until Spring 2005 when it switched to tabloid. The paper has a website which is updated twice daily and a tablet e-paper. In May 2013 the paper began to use the duplex serif and sans typefaces designed by Berton Hasbe.

The circulation of Sundsvalls Tidning was 27,300 copies in 2012 and 25,400 copies in 2013.

See also
List of Swedish newspapers

References

External links
 

1841 establishments in Sweden
Sundsvalls Tidning
Sundsvalls Tidning
Newspapers established in 1841
Sundsvalls Tidning